The 1962 Ithaca Bombers baseball team represented Ithaca College in the 1962 NCAA University Division baseball season. The head coach was Bucky Freeman, serving his 31st year. The Bombers completed an undefeated regular season, and got 5th place in the 1962 College World Series.

Roster

Schedule 

! style="" | Regular Season
|- valign="top" 

|- align="center" bgcolor="#ccffcc"
| 1 || April 10 || at  || Unknown • University Park, Pennsylvania || 14–5 || 1–0
|- align="center" bgcolor="#ccffcc"
| 2 || April 12 || at  || Unknown • Brookville, New York || 5–2 || 2–0
|- align="center" bgcolor="#ccffcc"
| 3 || April 14 || at  || Unknown • Teaneck, New Jersey || 7–2 || 3–0
|- align="center" bgcolor="#ccffcc"
| 4 || April 21 ||  || South Hill Diamond • Ithaca, New York || 28–4 || 4–0
|- align="center" bgcolor="#ccffcc"
| 5 ||  ||  || Unknown • Unknown || 11–5 || 5–0
|- align="center" bgcolor="#ccffcc"
| 6 || April 27 || at  || Unknown • West Hartford, Connecticut || 20–8 || 6–0
|- align="center" bgcolor="#ccffcc"
| 7 || April 28 || at Holy Cross || Fitton Field • Worcester, Massachusetts || 7–6 || 7–0
|-

|-
! bgcolor="#DDDDFF" width="3%" | #
! bgcolor="#DDDDFF" width="7%" | Date
! bgcolor="#DDDDFF" width="14%" | Opponent
! bgcolor="#DDDDFF" width="25%" | Site/Stadium
! bgcolor="#DDDDFF" width="5%" | Score
! bgcolor="#DDDDFF" width="5%" | Overall Record
|- align="center" bgcolor="#ccffcc"
|- align="center" bgcolor="#ccffcc"
| 8 || May 5 ||  || South Hill Diamond • Ithaca, New York || 16–1 || 8–0
|- align="center" bgcolor="#ccffcc"
| 9 || May 10 || at Hartwick || Unknown • Oneonta, New York || 21–0 || 9–0
|- align="center" bgcolor="#ccffcc"
| 10 || May 13 ||  || Unknown • Unknown || 11–5 || 10–0
|- align="center" bgcolor="#ccffcc"
| 11 || May 13  || Canisius || Unknown • Unknown || 8–0 || 11–0
|- align="center" bgcolor="#ccffcc"
| 12 ||  ||  || Unknown • Unknown || 3–0 || 12–0
|- align="center" bgcolor="#ccffcc"
| 13 ||  || C. W. Post || Unknown • Unknown || 14–3 || 13–0
|- align="center" bgcolor="#ccffcc"
| 14 ||  ||  || Unknown • Unknown || 8–3 || 14–0
|- align="center" bgcolor="#ccffcc"
| 15 ||  ||  || Unknown • Unknown || 4–0 || 15–0
|-

|-
! style="" | Postseason
|- valign="top"

|- align="center" bgcolor="#ccffcc"
| 16 ||  || vs Penn State || Unknown • University Park, Pennsylvania || 7–6 || 16–0
|- align="center" bgcolor="#ccffcc"
| 17 ||  ||  || Unknown • University Park, Pennsylvania || 7–4 || 17–0
|-

|- align="center" bgcolor="#ccffcc"
| 18 || June 11 || vs Missouri || Omaha Municipal Stadium • Omaha, Nebraska || 5–1 || 18–0
|- align="center" bgcolor="#ffcccc"
| 19 || June 12 || vs Florida State || Omaha Municipal Stadium • Omaha, Nebraska || 4–5 || 18–1
|- align="center" bgcolor="#ffcccc"
| 20 || June 13 || vs Texas || Omaha Municipal Stadium • Omaha, Nebraska || 2–3 || 18–2
|-

References 

Ithaca Bombers baseball seasons
Ithaca Bombers baseball
College World Series seasons
Ithaca